Cobb's Comedy Club is a stand-up comedy venue in San Francisco's North Beach neighborhood. It was founded in 1982 and has had many top comedians on its stage.

History

Chestnut Street
Originally known as Cobb’s Pub, Cobb’s Comedy Club was opened and operated by Ron Kakiki and John Cantu in 1982 at 2069 Chestnut Street in San Francisco’s Marina District.

The Cannery
In 1987, it moved to the Cannery Shopping Center in the historic Fisherman's Wharf, San Francisco neighborhood, where it thrived for over a decade with owners Tom and Carolyn Sawyer, who went on to run the venue for more than 25 years.

In March 2002 a five-alarm fire broke out at The Cannery. Damage from the fire and subsequent flooding closed Cobb’s for a month before forcing the Sawyers into a lawsuit which eventually resulted in the club’s eviction from the building.

Columbus Avenue
With the help of some prominent comedian friends, the Sawyers raised enough money to reopen Cobb’s in November 2002 at 915 Columbus Avenue in San Francisco’s North Beach neighborhood, in the club formerly known as "Dance Your Ass Off" (disco), later Wolfgang’s (rock), where, as of August 2022, it remains.

Sister clubs
Punch Line San Francisco is San Francisco’s longest-running comedy club, and a sister club of Cobb’s Comedy Club. The Punch Line was owned and operated by Bill Graham in 1978 in the rock venue formerly known as the Old Waldorf.

Punch Line Sacramento, a comedy club in Sacramento, was opened and operated by Bill Graham Presents in 1991 as an expansion of the comedy club of the same name in San Francisco.

References

External links
 Official website
 

Comedy clubs in California
Culture of San Francisco
Entertainment venues in San Francisco
North Beach, San Francisco